The Crime of Sylvestre Bonnard is the first novel by Anatole France, published in 1881. With this work, one of his first written entirely in prose, he made himself known as a novelist; he had been primarily known as a poet affiliated with Parnassianism because of his book of poetry, Poèmes dorés, which imitated Parnassian type verse. The novel received the Académie française prize.

In 1929 it was adapted into a French silent film of the same title.

Summary
The novel contains two stories. In the first, "La Buche,"Sylvestre Bonnard, a member of the Institut de France, is a historian and philologist, gifted with great erudition. He lives among books, and launches himself into the research, in Sicily and Paris, of the precious manuscript of the French version of the Golden Legend, which he finally obtains. In the second,"Jeanne Alexandre," by chance he meets a young girl named Jeanne, the granddaughter of a woman he once loved. Before the revision of 1902, Jeanne was a daughter and not a granddaughter To protect the child from her abusive guardian Maitre Mouche, Bonnard takes her away, and she ends up marrying Henri Gelis, one of Bonnard's students.

Character
Bonnard, the protagonist is modeled on the author. Although Bonnard is an old intellectual who spends most of his time reading, he is very like the author at the time the book was written.France portrays Bonnard as naïve and candid, a passive gentle watcher without the ability to be competent in the world. But Bonnard is not simple. Bonnard like France is not unmoved, but did little to change circumstances. France like his protagonist, Bonnard spent much of his time reading with few friends and few encounters with reality. Yet he was wise, discussing and writing about the problems of existence.

Irony
The epistolary novel, told as diary entries is said, to be written in the style of O. Henry and Guy Maupassant,  romanticist and realist writers respectively, whose stories often have ironic endings France was known as an ironist. In The Crime of Sylvestre Bonnard, the chief irony is that which is considered a crime. The protagonist considers the "crime" to be that he keeps some of the books he was going to sell for Jeanne's dowry. But the reader understands Bonnard's crime to be that he abducts the girl from her abusive guardian, thus rescuing her. To call a rescuer a criminal is ironic. Some critics claim that it was not so much that Anatole was ironic, but that he was detached. He claimed he had a free mind and could "accept the relativity of things"
Some have compared France's humor in the book to Fielding, Sterne and Dickens; Dickens Pickwick and Bardell are similar to Mlle. Pre′fe′re's pursuit of Bonnard

Criticism
 
Critics claim the second story is only loosely related to the first,"La Buche." And in the first edition, they were even less related as France revised the novel in 1902  Others claim that the novel is little more than a character study of Bonnard. Others claim that "La Buche" is an anecdote and "Jeanne Alexanndre" an episode

References

External links

 

Novels by Anatole France
1881 French novels
French novels adapted into films